East Lake Golf Club is a private golf club 5 miles east of downtown Atlanta, Georgia. Established in 1904, it is the oldest golf course in the city. East Lake was the home course of golfer Bobby Jones and much of its clubhouse serves as a tribute to his accomplishments.

Since 2004, East Lake has been the permanent home of The Tour Championship, the culminating event of the PGA Tour Playoffs for the FedEx Cup. The Tour Championship was first played at the course in 1998. The reigning Tour Championship and FedEx Cup champion is Rory McIlroy.

All proceeds from operations at East Lake Golf Club—more than $20 million to date—go to support the East Lake Foundation, which has helped transform one of the nation's worst public housing projects into a thriving community.

History

Early years

The Atlanta Athletic Club (AAC) was formed in 1898 and due to its popularity it gained 700 members in only four years. The director of the club's athletic program was John Heisman, the famous football coach for whom the Heisman Trophy is named. In 1904 the AAC bought property at East Lake to build a country club which included a golf course. Course architect Tom Bendelow was asked to lay out the course.

The course's first holes were built in 1906 and were initially only seven holes, then nine. In the summer of 1907, the course was expanded to 17 holes, and later that year the 18th hole was built to complete it. Also in 1907, the first significant tournament was hosted at East Lake, the Southern Amateur, won by Nelson Whitney. In 1908, Tom Bendelow opened his "No. 2" course at East Lake.

In 1913, famed golf course architect Donald Ross redesigned the course at East Lake.  The new plan provided for each of the nine holes to conclude at the clubhouse. Ross also redesigned the No. 2 course in 1928.

A tragic fire destroyed the original clubhouse at East Lake in 1925.  Following the fire, famed architect Philip Shutze, who is known for constructing the famous Swan House in Buckhead, was hired by the club to build East Lake's present day two-story Tudor style clubhouse.

Golfer Bobby Jones is said to have played his first and last games of golf at East Lake. Jones won golf's Grand Slam in 1930, claiming the U.S. Amateur, U.S. Open, British Amateur and British Open titles in the same year. Jones's father, "Colonel" Robert P. Jones, served as the president of East Lake from 1937–42 and as a director for 38 years. Bobby Jones himself also served as president of East Lake from 1946–47.

Other notable East Lake players around the same time were amateurs Watts Gunn, Perry Adair, Charlie Yates and Alexa Stirling Fraser many of whom were assisted by East Lake's golf professional Stewart Maiden.

In 1963, East Lake hosted the 15th biennial Ryder Cup where Arnold Palmer served as the playing captain of the winning US Team.

Redevelopment
East Lake began a downward slope when the surrounding neighborhood deteriorated in the 1960s and became victim to suburban flight. The Atlanta Athletic Club became a part of this when it sold the No. 2 course to developers and moved to its current home in Johns Creek. The original course and clubhouse were saved by a group of 25 members, led by Atlanta businessman Paul Grigsby, who purchased them and created East Lake Country Club in 1968.

In 1970, the East Lake Meadows public housing project was built on the site of the No. 2 golf course and became a center for poverty, drugs and violence. Middle-income homeowners fled the surrounding neighborhood, replaced by low-income renters. By the 1980s, East Lake became a mostly forgotten golf course in a seemingly hopeless neighborhood.

This all changed in 1993 when a local charitable foundation headed by Tom Cousins purchased East Lake with the intent to restore it as a tribute to Bobby Jones and the club's other great amateur golfers. The East Lake Foundation was also created and has used the renovation as a catalyst for revitalizing the surrounding community.

In 1994, Rees Jones, son of golf course architect Robert Trent Jones, restored Donald Ross' original golf course design at East Lake to its current layout.

In 1998 the Tour Championship was hosted at East Lake for the first time.  In 2005 East Lake was named the permanent home of the Tour Championship. East Lake has hosted the tournament 16 times since 1998.

Today

Golf with a Purpose
All of the profits from East Lake Golf Club go to support the East Lake Foundation which in turn helps to support the health, education, safety and productivity of the East Lake neighborhood. Because of this, East Lake Golf Club's motto is "Golf with a Purpose".

Based on the success of the East Lake model, a new organization, Purpose Built Communities, was established in 2009 to help fight concentrated segments of poverty in communities throughout the United States. Today, Purpose Built Communities is present in 14 cities in the US.

Charlie Yates Golf Course
In 1998 East Lake's No. 2 golf course was transformed into the Charlie Yates Golf Course, a 9-hole "executive" public course that provides golf education to children living in the city of Atlanta. The course was rated one of the top 10 short range courses in America by Golf Range Magazine and all profits from the course go to benefit the East Lake Foundation.

Charlie Yates was an East Lake golfer who won the British Amateur at Royal Troon Golf Club in 1938. Charlie grew up on Second Avenue, the street which separated East Lake's main course from its No. 2 course. His boyhood hero was Bobby Jones, whom he knew and played with on the course at East Lake.

The Tour Championship

Since 2004 East Lake Golf Club has been the permanent location of the Tour Championship, the finale of the PGA Tour Playoffs and the FedEx Cup.  The Tour Championship is also one of the largest supporters of the East Lake Foundation.

East Lake Cup
In May 2015 it was announced that East Lake would be the site of a new collegiate golf tournament, the East Lake Cup. In partnership with the Golf Channel the East Lake Cup invites the top men's and women's teams from the previous season to compete in a match play championship each November. The tournament is broadcast on the Golf Channel. The inaugural East Lake Cup was played November 2 and 3, 2015. The champions of the first year's tournament were Illinois (men's) and USC (women's).

The 2016  the tournament added a day of stroke play to the competition with Illinois winning on the men's side and Duke winning on the women's side. The men's and women's winners of the 2017 East Lake Cup were respectively Vanderbilt University and the University of Southern California. The 2018 winner's were Auburn for the men's side and USC on the women's side.

Course

Course records
Par 72 – Robert "Bullet" Godfrey, 63 (−9) on August 20, 2001 at the U.S. Amateur after bogeying the final two holes.

Scorecard

Tournaments hosted
East Lake has hosted many prestigious tournaments including:

The Tour Championship 

2022  Rory McIlroy
2021  Patrick Cantlay
2020  Dustin Johnson
2019  Rory McIlroy
2018  Tiger Woods
2017  Xander Schauffele
2016  Rory McIlroy
2015  Jordan Spieth
2014  Billy Horschel
2013  Henrik Stenson
2012  Brandt Snedeker
2011  Bill Haas
2010  Jim Furyk
2009  Phil Mickelson
2008  Camilo Villegas
2007  Tiger Woods
2006  Adam Scott
2005  Bart Bryant
2004  Retief Goosen
2002  Vijay Singh
2000  Phil Mickelson
1998  Hal Sutton

East Lake Cup 

2018 Auburn University men and University of Southern California women
Individual medalists: Viktor Hovland (Oklahoma State University men) and Albane Valenzuela (Stanford University women)
2017 Vanderbilt University men and University of Southern California women
Individual medalists: Will Gordon (Vanderbilt University men) and Robynn Ree (University of Southern California women)
2016 University of Illinois men and Duke University women
Individual medalists: Scottie Scheffler (University of Texas men) and  Andrea Lee (Stanford University women)
2015 University of Illinois men and University of Southern California women 

Ryder Cup
1963 
U.S. Amateur
2001  Bubba Dickerson
U.S. Women's Amateur
1950  Beverly Hanson
Southern Amateur
1907 Nelson Whitney
1910 F.G. Byrd
1915 Charles Dexter
1922 Bobby Jones
1933 Jack Redmond
2002 Lee Williams
Other tournaments
1919 Southern Open won by Jim Barnes
1920 Southern Open won by J. Douglas Edgar
1927 Southern Open won by Bobby Jones
1997 Western Junior won by Nick Cassini

References

External links

Tour Championship coverage

Buildings and structures in DeKalb County, Georgia
Golf clubs and courses in Georgia (U.S. state)
Golf clubs and courses designed by Donald Ross
Ryder Cup venues
Sports venues in Atlanta
Golf clubs and courses designed by Rees Jones
Golf clubs and courses designed by Tom Bendelow
Sports venues completed in 1906
1906 establishments in Georgia (U.S. state)